Netflix is an American global on-demand Internet streaming media provider, that has distributed a number of original programs, including original series, specials, miniseries, documentaries and films.

Specials

Series/collections

Upcoming
The following projects have all been announced as being in development, but do not have a specific release date known at this time.

Specials

Series/collections

References

External links
 Netflix Originals current list on Netflix (based on geolocation)

Lists of Netflix original programming